Riddle Hill is a mountain in Barnstable County, Massachusetts. Swifts Hill is located north of Riddle Hill.

References

Mountains of Massachusetts
Mountains of Barnstable County, Massachusetts